Anthony or Tony Griffin may refer to:

Anthony J. Griffin (1866–1935), U.S. Representative from New York
Anthony C. Griffin, American plastic surgeon
Anthony Griffin (Royal Navy officer) (1920–1996), Controller of the Royal Navy
Anthony Griffin (rugby league) (born 1966), Australian rugby league football coach
Anthony Griffin (footballer) (born 1979), retired English footballer
Tony Griffin (born 1981), hurler
Tony Griffin (athlete), British Paralympic athlete